Irina Yuryevna Leonova (born August 22, 1978) is a  Russian theater and film actress.

Biography 
Irina Leonova was born in Tallinn. In 2000, she graduated from Mikhail Shchepkin Higher Theatre School and  joined Maly Theatre.

Personal life 
 In 2000 — 2004 Irina was married to actor Igor Petrenko (born 1977).
 In 2005 — 2015  Irina was married to actor Yevgeny Tsyganov (born 1979). They have seven children:
daughter Polina (2005)
son Nikita (2006)
son Andrey (2009),
daughter Sophia (2010)
son Alexander (2011)
son George (2014)
daughter Vera (2015).

Selected filmography
 Poisons or the World History of Poisoning (2001) as episode
 Children of the Arbat (2004) as Lena Budyagina

Awards 
 2004 —  State Prize of the Russian Federation

References

External links 
 
 Биография 

1978 births
Living people
Actresses from Tallinn
State Prize of the Russian Federation laureates
Russian film actresses
Russian stage actresses
Russian television actresses
20th-century Russian actresses
21st-century Russian actresses